The following list sorts all cities and municipalities in the German state of Saxony-Anhalt with a population of more than 10,000. As of December 31, 2021, 53 cities fulfill this criterion and are listed here. This list refers only to the population of individual municipalities within their defined limits, which does not include other municipalities or suburban areas within urban agglomerations.

List 

The following table lists the 53 cities and municipalities in Saxony-Anhalt with a population of at least 10,000 on December 31, 2021, as estimated by the State Statistical Office of Saxony-Anhalt. A city is displayed in bold if it is a state or federal capital.

References

External links 
 Cities in Saxony-Anhalt by population

Cities by population
Saxony-Anhalt
Cities by population